Renaud Verley (born 9 November 1945) is a French actor. He appeared in more than twenty films since 1965. His brother Bernard Verley is also an actor.

Filmography

References

External links 

1945 births
Living people
French male film actors